The Dell is a shinty stadium in the town of Kingussie, Scotland.  It is the home of Kingussie Camanachd and has been a shinty venue for almost 150 years.

Location

The park is situated beside the River Spey on the outskirts of Kingussie in an area known as the Dellmore of Kingussie on the road to Ruthven.

History

Shinty is recorded as being first played at the Dell in 1866.

It has hosted 5 Camanachd Cup finals, the most recent in 1999.  The stadium was one of the first in shinty to have crowd control barriers in place.

The park was owned by Dochfour Estates but Kingussie Camanachd purchased the ground in 2010 and marked this historic transfer of ownership with a ceremony with a reception. This has allowed the club to make improvements to what is already one of the best playing surfaces in shinty.

The club has recently constructed a stand which has been flood proofed in 2017 to allow the holding of the Camanachd Cup final in Kingussie again. A Camanachd Cup Final was to have been held at the Dell in September 2020.

References

External links
Kingussie Shinty Club
The Dell changes hands

Sports venues in Highland (council area)
Shinty venues
Kingussie